Fayne is a surname. Notable people with the surname include:

People 
 Dorothy Fayne (1889-1976), British actress
 Tony Fayne (1924-2009), English comedian
 Mark Fayne (born 1987), American ice hockey player

Characters 
 George Fayne, a character in the Nancy Drew Mystery Stories series
 Michael Fayne, character in V Wars